Next Year in Zion is a 2008 studio album by Herman Düne. Lead singer and songwriter David-Ivar Herman Düne states "It's the first album that I write while I am happy. I used to think I needed to be a little sad, or at least melancholic to write, this one proved me wrong."

Track listing 
All songs written by David-Ivar Herman Düne, except where noted.

 "My Home Is Nowhere Without You" – 4:11
 "Try to Think About Me (Don't You Worry a Bit)" – 4:04
 "When the Sun Rose Up This Morning" – 5:06
 "When We Were Still Friends" – 2:39
 "On a Saturday" – 3:59
 "My Baby Is Afraid of Sharks" – 4:32
 "Lovers Are Waterproof" – 4:52
 "Next Year In Zion" – 3:00
 "Someone Knows Better Than Me" – 4:17
 "My Best Kiss" – 3:46
 "Baby Baby You're My Baby" – 2:10
 "(Nothing Left But) Poison In the Rain" – 4:26

Personnel 

David-Ivar Herman Düne – guitar, vocals<
Néman Herman Düne – drums
Dave Tattersall (of The Wave Pictures) – guitar
The Babyskins – backing vocals
The Jon Natchez Bourbon Horn Players (on loan from Beirut)

References

2008 albums
Herman Dune albums